The 2002 Atlantic Sun men's basketball tournament was held February 28–March 2 at the Curb Event Center at Belmont University in Nashville, Tennessee. This was the first Atlantic Sun tournament after the conference changed its name from the Trans America Athletic Conference.

 defeated defending champions  in the championship game, 76–75, to win their first Atlantic Sun men's basketball tournament.

The Owls, therefore, received the TAAC's automatic bid to the 2002 NCAA tournament, their first appearance in the Division I tournament.

Format
The Atlantic Sun added Belmont as their eleventh member prior to the season. However, the tournament reverted to its old format whereby only the top eight teams from the conference tournament were eligible for the tournament. These eight teams were seeded based on regular season conference records.

Bracket

References

ASUN men's basketball tournament
Tournament
Atlantic Sun men's basketball tournament
Atlantic Sun men's basketball tournament
Atlantic Sun men's basketball tournament